John Schwartz may refer to: 

John Schwartz (1793-1860), United States congressman
John Burnham Schwartz (born 1965), American novelist
John William Schwartz (1755-after 1802), Nova Scotia politician
John Schwartz (mayor), mayor of Savannah, Georgia, 1889–1891

See also
John Swartz (1858-1930), American photographer
John Schwarz (disambiguation)
Jonathan Schwartz (disambiguation)